Pabuji is a folk-deity of Rajasthan in India who is also worshiped in parts of Gujarat and the Indus plain.

The Narrative of Pabuji
The narrative of Pabuji is sung by the Bhopa poet-singers of Nayak community is based according to the tradition on a text, the Pabuprakasa. This text, according to the Bhopas consists of number of episodes of two different types, parvaros and sayls. The narrative of Pabuji is found in the Nainsi ri Khyat (17th century) under the title Vata Pabujiri.

Episodes of Pabuji
Dhandal Rathore had four children, two sons (Buro and Pabuji) and two daughters (Sonalbai and Pemabai). When he died, both his sons set up court in their village of Kolu; but Pabuji was a god incarnate, born not from Dhandal's wife but from a celestial nymph who had promised him that when he was twelve years old she would return to him in the form of a mare for him to ride. He had four companions: Chando and Dhebo, two brothers of whom Dhebo was a colossus with an insatiable appetite for food, drink and opium, and immensely aggressive; Salji Solanki the augurer; and Harmal the Rebari herdsman.

Pabuji's first exploit was to fight the Khinchis, who were encroaching on his borders and treating him and Buro arrogantly. In the course of the fight Jindrao Khinchi's father was killed. To try to prevent a blood-feud Pabuji and Buro gave Khinchi their sister Pema in marriage. But in fact he remained hostile, and his hostility was brought to a head when Pabuji secured from the Charan lady Deval (an incarnation of the Goddess) the fine black mare Kesar Kalami, on whom Khinchi had set his heart. The mare was, of course, Pabuji's mother returned to him. In exchange for the mare, Pabuji promised to protect Deval from Khinchi's raids.

Then he set off on his exploits: he overthrew Mirza Khan, the cow-killing king of Patan, and then went to bathe in the holy lake of Pushkar to cleanse himself of the sin of bloodshed. Whilst he was bathing his foot slipped, and he was saved from drowning by the snake-god baba Goga devji Chauhan. As a reward Pabuji offered him the hand of his niece Kelam, Buro's daughter, and he accepted. But Kelam's parents were fiercely opposed to any such wedding, and so Pabuji set up a subterfuge instead. At his instigation, Gogaji turned himself into a venomous snake and concealed himself in the garden; and when Kelam came there to swing he bit her on the little finger. The curers were unable to do anything for her, but Pabuji said that she could be cured by tying on her arm an amulet in Gogaji's name, provided that she was then married to him. The cure worked and the wedding had to go ahead.

During the wedding-ceremony various people gave costly presents to Kelam; when his turn came, Pabuji said, "I shall plunder she-camels from Ravana the demon king of Lanka to give you. Everyone laughed, for camels were then unknown in Rajasthan and Lanka was known to be impregnable. And when Kelam reached her husband's home her in-laws taunted her mercilessly. So she sent a letter to Pabuji imploring him to carry out his promise. He sent one of his men, Harmal Dewasi, to Lanka to reconnoitre; and Harmal, disguised as a jogi (holy man), managed to get the information they needed, and also obtained physical evidences of the she-camels, all this despite being mistrusted and ill treated by the inhabitants of Lanka. Then he returned to Kolu with his news, and they all set off to raid Lanka. They crossed the sea by Pabuji's power and rounded up Ravana's she-camels; then they did battle with Ravana and his army and defeated them, Pabuji himself killing Ravana with his spear.

On their way to give the captured she-camels to Kelam they had to pass through Umarkot in Sindh, and here the Sodhi princess Phulvanti saw Pabuji and fell in love with him. Pabuji continued on his way: he triumphed in an encounter with Devnarayan, and was soon able to hand over the she-camels to a delighted Kelam and return home to Kolu. But now he received a wedding-proposal from Phulvanti's father. At first he tried to avoid it, and even when he capitulated and accepted it he caused further delay by insisting that saffron be obtained to dye the garments of the men who travelled in his wedding-procession—which resulted in an all-out war with Lakkhu Pathan, the owner of the saffron. But at last he set off back to Umarkot to be married. Deval, to whom he had promised his protection, stopped him on the way and tried to persuade him to stay, or at least to leave some of his men behind, but he refused, promising that if she needed him he would come instantly, even if he were sitting inside the wedding-pavilion. Then the wedding-procession started off once more, but as they travelled they observed numbers of bad omens, culminating in a tiger which Dhebo killed. They reached Umarkot, and the preparations for the wedding went ahead smoothly; but before the ceremony itself was even complete Deval arrived in the form of a bird to say that Khinchi had stolen her cattle.

Pabuji insisted on abandoning the wedding in order to ride in pursuit: he severed the bridal knot with his sword, and gave his bride a parrot which would tell her what became of him. He rode back to Kolu with his men, and after some slight delay set out in pursuit of the Khinchis, leaving only Dhebo behind asleep. Deval woke Dhebo up and sent him out too, and he soon overtook Pabuji, for when his horse tired from endless galloping, he picked it up and put it under his arm and ran on. Then disaster befell him. Vultures began to circle over him, and he as usual told them to be patient ("I shall satiate you with the vital organs of the Khinchis!"); but these vultures were not content, and told him that they wished to eat his own flesh. Dhebo was a man of such noble character that he could refuse no request, so he disembowelled himself for the birds. Then he drew his belt tight, and rode on; and soon he caught up with Khinchi. Single-handed he destroyed Khinchi's whole army, until only Khinchi himself was left alive, and he was about to kill him too when Pabuji, who had arrived on the battlefield, stayed his hand: "If you kill him you make my sister Pema a widow." They freed Khinchi, and set off to give Deval back her cattle. On the way, when Pabuji offered Dhebo some opium, Dhebo revealed that he was disembowelled, and died.

Pabuji and his remaining men now returned the cattle to Deval, but she kept making objections: first she said her favourite bull-calf was missing—but it was discovered inside Dhebo's opium-box, where he had put it as a joke; then she complained that her cattle were thirsty and told Pabuji to water them—but when he tried to do so he found that all the water in the well had been swallowed on Deval's instructions by a genie named Susiyo Pir. He struck the genie through the head with his spear and watered the cattle; but by the time he had finished doing all this Khinchi had been able to enlist the support of his uncle Jaisingh Bhati, and was riding on Kolu with a Bhati army. There was a great battle, in which Pabuji and Khinchi came face to face. Pabuji said, "Khinchi, take my sword and give me your whip: my body cannot fall to a blow from your sword." They exchanged weapons, but at first Khinchi did nothing; so Pabuji goaded him into fury by whipping him, and Khinchi struck back at him with the sword. Instantly, a palanquin came from heaven and took Pabuji away with his mare. After this, Pabuji's men were wiped out quickly, the last to fall being Buro, who had his head cut off by Khinchi.

Buro's wife had a terrible dream in which she saw the massacre of the Rathores; and when she awoke the news was confirmed by the camel-rider Harmal Dewasi, who brought her the turban of her dead husband. Similarly in Umarkot Phulvanti heard the news from her parrot, which then died. Then all the women prepared to become satis (i.e. to follow their husbands into death by mounting the funeral pyre). But Buro's widow was advanced in pregnancy, and before becoming a sati she took a knife and cut out from her body a male child. She named him Rupnath, and had him sent to her mother's home in Girnar to be looked after.

Rupnath grew up in ignorance of his origins, but one day when he was twelve years old he encountered Deval, and persuaded her to tell him the truth. Then he was consumed by desire to take revenge on Khinchi. In the disguise of a holy man ( Gogo Chauhan)  he went to Khinchi's place, and his aunt Pema (Khinchi's wife) told him how to avoid the traps and savage animals with which Khinchi guarded himself. He was successful in doing this, and thus came into the room where Khinchi was asleep. He awoke him, told him who he was, and then beheaded him. Pema helped her nephew escape, and asked him for her husband's head, for her to commit Sati with. After playing with the head, Rupnath kicks Khinchi's head back to Pema. After killing Khinchi, Rupnath becomes a sage and meditates for the rest of his days.

See also
List of Rajputs
Bhopa
Pabuji Ki Phad
Vadhel

References

 Smith, John D. (2005). The Epic of Pabuji, New Delhi: Katha, 
 Kamphorst, Janet (2008). In Praise of Death: History and Poetry in Medieval Marwar (South Asia). Leiden: Leiden University Press.

External links
The epic of Pabuji
Phad - Paintings on cloth

In praise of death : history and poetry in medieval Marwar
Nomadic Narratives

Folk deities of Rajasthan